The women's 4 × 100 metres relay at the 2022 European Athletics Championships will take place at the Olympiastadion on 19 and 21 August.

Records

Schedule

Results

Round 1
First 3 in each heat (Q) and 2 best performers (q) advance to the Final.

Final

In the final, two teams, Great Britain and France, failed to finish, after failing to complete the first baton exchange within the zone.

References

4 x 100 metres relay W
Relays at the European Athletics Championships
Euro